The Odeon Theatre (formerly known as The Strand Theatre) is a historic former cinema and live entertainment venue in the city of Hobart, Tasmania, Australia.

History
The idea for a world-class theatre for the people of Tasmania was conceived by merchant E.J. Miller, who made his fortune on the Zeehan mineral field.
Miller would have witnessed the rising popularity of the first silent films in vaudeville programming at the Gaiety Theatre and Theatre Royal in the township of Zeehan. Travelling to the United States, Miller visited every major city and studied the latest picture theatre designs to immerse himself in the emerging industry. On his return to Tasmania he engaged with Hobart architect George Stanley Crisp, who had previously designed the Art Nouveau Palace Theatre opposite the Hobart GPO on Elizabeth Street. Located on the corner of Liverpool Street and Watchorn Street, Miller's original theatre design was intended to be a replica of The Strand in New York.

The Strand Theatre
An exceptional example of the Federation Free Classical style, the building featured an iconic checkered parapet, composite order pilasters, decorative cornices, leadlight windows and wrought iron lanterns. Internally, it featured seating for 1,200 people (719 in the stalls and 481 in the dress circle), a Tasmanian Blackwood staircase and dress circle, Wunderlich ceilings, three cloak rooms, immersive wall murals, as well as fixtures and fittings manufactured in Glenorchy.
Built as a silent picture house, when The Strand Theatre opened on May 22, 1916, mayor L.H. Macleod declared "this is undoubtedly the finest building in Tasmania".
The venue was equipped with state-of-the-art technology, including dimmable atmospheric lighting, early electric ticketing machines, projection equipment imported from Britain and a six-rank Wurlitzer organ, the only of its kind in Tasmania. The organ was operated by Ben Corrick, who also conducted The Strand Orchestra (on occasion from behind the organ's console) between 1920 and 1928.
Located at the west end of Hobart's CBD along the busy Liverpool Street tram line and directly opposite His Majesty's Theatre, locals referred to the "west end" when visiting the pictures or theatre. Village Cinemas capitalised on this in 1976, naming Tasmania's first multiplex on nearby Collins Street the West End Twin.

From 1918 to 1920, nimbyism lead to some residents demanding the government set up a Board of Censors to protect Tasmanian audiences from the "moral decay" associated with the show business world, escalating after a screening of Enlighten Thy Daughter at The Strand in 1920. The board was dissolved when the exhibitor complained of reduced patronage.

The cinema was taken over by Union Theatres, remodelled and relaunched with the Marx Brothers film The Cocoanuts in 1929. Sound equipment was installed and the venue was colloquially referred to as the "New Strand Theatre". The impact of sound lead to the disbanding of The Strand Orchestra and by 1940 the Wurlitzer was out of use. The Strand hosted Tasmanian premieres for many Australian-made films, including Jewelled Nights (1925), which was attended by author Marie Bjelke Petersen, future-Prime Minister Joseph Lyons (then-Premier of Tasmania), Dame Enid Lyons and mayor F. D. Valentine. Other Tasmanian premieres included The Squatter's Daughter, with a special appearance from actress Jocelyn Howarth, A Son is Born and the Australian premiere of Wherever She Goes (1951), a film about the life Zeehan-born pianist Eileen Joyce, which was introduced by Tasmanian Premier Robert Cosgrove.

Modernisation as the Odeon
In the mid-1950s, then-exhibitor Greater Union engaged with Sydney-based architects Guy Crick & Associates to modernise the theatre. The Strand underwent serious alterations, leaving the building both internally and externally unrecognisable. The façade was covered in rainscreen cladding to present in a modernist style. To achieve this effect, its cornices and pilasters were chiseled back, its parapet was partially levelled, leadlight windows discarded and wrought iron features removed. Modernist neon signage was erected. It reopened as the Odeon Theatre in 1956, the year of the Melbourne Olympics which saw the introduction of television across Australia. Although branded as "The Theatre of Tomorrow", Greater Union did not foresee the lasting effect of television.

The cinema last used the orchestra pit for musical entertainment in 1957 to raise funds for a Miss Tasmania contestant, named "Miss Greater Union Theatres". 
Based on the novel by Nan Chauncy, the Tasmanian feature film They Found a Cave premiered at the Odeon Theatre on 20 December 1962.

ABC Odeon Theatre
The Odeon fell into financial hardship and was purchased by the ABC in 1970, becoming a recording studio for ABC Radio. During the ABC's tenureship, it was known as the ABC Odeon Theatre, and internally referred to as Studio 720. At some point, pieces of cladding were removed to reveal several windows, including the central arch, to allow more light into the upstairs foyer.
It became the home of the Tasmanian Symphony Orchestra (TSO) in 1973. The TSO broadcast many radio and television performances from the theatre and recorded several albums. In 1978, vocalist Judith Durham of The Seekers and pianist Ron Edgeworth recorded material for their live album, The Hot Jazz Duo at the theatre. Other musicians to record at the Odeon include Larry Sitsky, Jan Sedivka, Ade Monsbourgh, Judi Connelli, Suzanne Johnston, Guy Noble, Deborah Conway, George Dreyfus, Scared Weird Little Guys, David Porcelijn, James Ledger, tenor Donald Smith, composer Michael Smetanin and the Australian Rosny Children's Choir. An ABC Shop occupied the Watchorn Street corner shopfront in the 1990s.

Over time, the world-class orchestra outgrew the theatre's amenities, with the dressing rooms and backstage facilities noted as being especially inadequate. After 28 years, the TSO relocated to Federation Concert Hall in 2001. The Odeon was then purchased by the Christian City Church, who renovated the interior and restored many of the original Federation-era features.

Riverlee and DarkLab redevelopment
In 2009, the Christian City Church sold the Odeon to Melbourne-based developer Riverlee. The building remained dormant for several years until it reopened as a live entertainment venue, charged by events curated for the MONA FOMA and Dark Mofo festivals. Hobart City Council gave permission for the building to be partially demolished in 2015. Initially, Riverlee planned to develop the building into a $69 million 11-story office tower accommodating some 1,850 workers, and included shops, restaurants and car parking.
The original building façade, disfigured beneath its 1950s cladding, was required to be retained and restored.

Riverlee acquired more properties on the block bound by Liverpool Street, Murray Street, and Watchorn Street that contain the Odeon Theatre and Tattersalls Hotel. The site has an  frontage along Liverpool Street. A town planning permit has been obtained for a commercial building of over  net lettable area.

In 2019, the Odeon and surrounding "Hanging Garden" cultural precinct underwent a $5 million mixed-use redevelopment. The scheme was developed in partnership with DarkLab, a subsidiary of the Museum of Old and New Art, which works on creative projects outside the usual scope of Mona.

2022 masterplan
In September 2022, Riveree and DarkLab unveiled a new masterplan for the Hanging Garden Precinct. Designed by Melbourne-based architects Fender Katsalidis with support from Six Degrees Architects, the new development outlines retaining and restoring the Odeon Theatre auditorium, whilst developing a fifteen story, "180+ key hotel" directly above the upper lobby area.

Contemporary use
Following a sold-out show of Queens of the Stone Age at the Odeon in 2014, the venue has been utilised by MONA FOMA and Dark Mofo festivals hosting events including Laurie Anderson, Nick Cave, Sarah Blasko, Archie Roach, Paul Kelly, King Gizzard & the Lizard Wizard, Cate Le Bon, Sharon Van Etten, Nick Murphy, Tim Minchin, Everclear, The Tea Party, The Dillinger Escape Plan, Einstürzende Neubauten and Xavier Rudd.
It has also been used as a venue for the Festival of Voices.

Gallery
All images have been sourced from the Tasmanian Archive and Heritage Office.

See also
List of theatres in Hobart

References

1916 establishments in Australia
Buildings and structures in Hobart
Cinemas in Hobart
Former cinemas
Culture in Hobart
Federation style architecture
Federation Free Classical architecture in Tasmania
History of Tasmania
Liverpool Street, Hobart
Odeon Cinemas
Theatres completed in 1916